"Superstars" is a successful 2008 single taken from Dreams in Colour, the 2007 album of the Portuguese singer David Fonseca. "Superstars" is the first of three singles from the album, the other three being "Rocket Man" and "Kiss Me, Oh Kiss Me".

During 2007-2008, "Superstars" stayed 33 weeks in the Portuguese Singles Top 50 chart including 4 weeks at #1.

Charts

References

External links
 Music video of "Superstars" by David Fonseca

2008 singles
David Fonseca songs
2008 songs
Universal Records singles
Song articles with missing songwriters